Pittosporum tanianum is a species of plant in the Pittosporaceae family. It is endemic to New Caledonia.  Its natural habitat is temperate forests. It is threatened by habitat loss.

References

Endemic flora of New Caledonia
tanianum
Critically endangered plants
Taxonomy articles created by Polbot